Omorgus genieri is a species of hide beetle in the subfamily Omorginae and subgenus Afromorgus.

References

genieri
Beetles described in 1991